The 2015 UCI Mountain Bike & Trials World Championships was the 26th edition of the UCI Mountain Bike & Trials World Championships, held in Vallnord, Andorra.

Medal summary

Men's events

Women's events

Team events

Medal table

See also
2015 UCI Mountain Bike World Cup

References

External links

Official website
The event on the UCI website

UCI Mountain Bike World Championships
International sports competitions hosted by Andorra
UCI Mountain Bike World Championships
2015 in Andorran sport
Cycle races in Andorra